Meisterstück (German for masterpiece) is the flagship line of pens from luxury brand Montblanc.

Although principally concerned with writing instruments, the brand has of late used the Meisterstück name in association with members of its diversified product range including watches, jewelry and leather goods.

History 
The first Montblanc to be branded a Meisterstück was produced in 1924 to denote the then Simplo company's top-line range of writing instruments.

Beginning initially with Safety Filling pens, the Meisterstück name continued to denote the company's top line of writing instruments bearing warranted nibs and offering higher grade features than other models, such as the incorporation of celluloid and precious metals.

Modern Meisterstücks 
Modern Meisterstücks include fountain pens, ballpoints, rollerballs, pencils, and even a highlighter pen.

Unlike vintage Meisterstück pens, modern variants are  usually formed from a composite resin instead of celluloid and bear most similarity to the Meisterstück designs of the 1950s. However, in continuation with the previous models using higher-end materials, metal and precious metal variations are made under the sub-designation "Solitaire".

References

External links
Montblanc
Fountainpen.de: photos of almost all Limited Editions
maxpens.de

Fountain pen and ink manufacturers